Bastian Knittel and Sebastian Rieschick were the defending champions, but they chose not to compete together.Knittel partnered up with Leonardo Tavares, but they lost in the second round against Guillermo Olaso and Grega Žemlja.Rieschick partnered up with Srirambalaji Narayanaswamy, but they lost in the semifinals against Matthias Bachinger and Denis Gremelmayr.Bachinger and Gremelmayer won in the final 6–4, 6–4 against Guillermo Olaso and Grega Žemlja.

Seeds

Main draw

Draw
{{16TeamBracket-Compact-Tennis3
| RD1=First round
| RD2=Quarterfinals
| RD3=Semifinals
| RD4=Final

| RD1-seed01=1
| RD1-team01= R Junaid G Trujillo-Soler
| RD1-score01-1=6
| RD1-score01-2=3
| RD1-score01-3=[12]
| RD1-seed02= 
| RD1-team02= P Červenák J Pospíšil
| RD1-score02-1=2
| RD1-score02-2=6
| RD1-score02-3=[14]

| RD1-seed03= 
| RD1-team03= M Bachinger D Gremelmayr
| RD1-score03-1= 
| RD1-score03-2= 
| RD1-score03-3=w/o
| RD1-seed04=WC
| RD1-team04= S Groen C Stebe
| RD1-score04-1= 
| RD1-score04-2= 
| RD1-score04-3= 

| RD1-seed05=3
| RD1-team05= M Crugnola S Vagnozzi
| RD1-score05-1=1
| RD1-score05-2=6
| RD1-score05-3=[10]
| RD1-seed06= 
| RD1-team06= I Belyaev D Matsukevich
| RD1-score06-1=6
| RD1-score06-2=4
| RD1-score06-3=[6]

| RD1-seed07= 
| RD1-team07= I Cervantes P Clar-Rosselló
| RD1-score07-1=4
| RD1-score07-2=4
| RD1-score07-3= 
| RD1-seed08=WC
| RD1-team08=
| RD2-score04-1=7
| RD2-score04-2= 
| RD2-score04-3= 

| RD2-seed05= 
| RD2-team05= G Olaso G Žemlja
| RD2-score05-1=4
| RD2-score05-2=6
| RD2-score05-3=[10]
| RD2-seed06=4
| RD2-team06= B Knittel L Tavares
| RD2-score06-1=6
| RD2-score06-2=4
| RD2-score06-3=[7]

| RD2-seed07= 
| RD2-team07= K Kravchuk I Sergeyev
| RD2-score07-1=5
| RD2-score07-2=3
| RD2-score07-3= 
| RD2-seed08=2
| RD2-team08= B Battistone R DeHeart
| RD2-score08-1=7
| RD2-score08-2=6
| RD2-score08-3= 

| RD3-seed01= 
| RD3-team01= M Bachinger D Gremelmayr
| RD3-score01-1=6
| RD3-score01-2=7
| RD3-score01-3= 
| RD3-seed02=WC
| RD3-team02=
| RD3-score02-1=4
| RD3-score02-2=61
| RD3-score02-3= 

| RD3-seed03= 
| RD3-team03= G Olaso G Žemlja
| RD3-score03-1=7
| RD3-score03-2=7
| RD3-score03-3= 
| RD3-seed04=2
| RD3-team04= B Battistone R DeHeart
| RD3-score04-1=5
| RD3-score04-2=64
| RD3-score04-3= 

| RD4-seed01= 
| RD4-team01=

References
 Main Draw

Marburg Open - Doubles
2010 Doubles